The Children's Party attack was an attack which took place during the Aden Emergency. Terrorists threw a grenade into a children's party being held at the RAF Khormaksar. One girl was killed (Gillian Sidey, daughter of Air Commodore E. Sidey) and four children wounded.

It was part of a general outbreak of violence around Christmas in Aden 1964: on 26 December Inspector Fadhl Khalil of Aden Special Branch was shot dead when terrorists fired at him and four other policemen in the bazaar at Crater Town. On Christmas Eve, a British sentry shot dead an Arab.

References

Aden Emergency
Deaths by hand grenade
Terrorist incidents in Asia in 1964
December 1964 events in Asia
1964 in the Federation of South Arabia
1964 murders in Asia
Female murder victims
Explosions in 1964